Paraconger ophichthys is an eel in the family Congridae (conger/garden eels). It was described by Samuel Garman in 1899, originally under the genus Atopichthys. It is a tropical, marine eel which is known from Cocos Island, in the eastern central Pacific Ocean. It is known to dwell at a depth of 1953 metres.

References

Congridae
Fish described in 1899